Fedor Igorevich Belyakov (born April 10, 1993) a Russian professional ice hockey defenceman who currently plays with Avangard Omsk organization of the Kontinental Hockey League (KHL).

Playing career
Belyakov was selected 27th overall in the second round of 2010 KHL Junior Draft by Metallurg Novokuznetsk.

On 6 May 2019, Belyakov left HC CSKA Moscow for a second time following the 2018–19 season, securing a one-year contract with his 8th KHL club, Avtomobilist Yekaterinburg.

After concluding a second stint with Admiral Vladivostok in the 2021–22 season, Belyakov joined Avangard Omsk as a free agent on 22 May 2022.

Career statistics

References

External links

1993 births
Living people
Admiral Vladivostok players
Barys Nur-Sultan players
HC CSKA Moscow players
Kuznetskie Medvedi players
Russian ice hockey defencemen
Nomad Astana players
Salavat Yulaev Ufa players
HC Sibir Novosibirsk players
Snezhnye Barsy players
HC Neftekhimik Nizhnekamsk players
Ice hockey people from Moscow
Torpedo Nizhny Novgorod players
HC Yugra